Kacper Rosa (born 13 August 1994) is a Polish professional footballer who plays as a goalkeeper for Motor Lublin.

Senior career

Rosa started his youth career with the club in his home town of Kostrzyn nad Odrą. He then had youth spells with other teams close by, with UKP Zielona Góra and Falubaz Zielona Góra based in Zielona Góra, and GKP Gorzów Wielkopolski based in Gorzów Wielkopolski. Rosa's big break came in 2012, when he joined the Ekstraklasa team Lechia Gdańsk. He joined the Lechia second team, with whom he played in the league with, playing a total of 27 games during his time with the club. A year after joining Lechia, Rosa signed a new deal keeping him with the club until 2017. However, he didn't complete the contract and joined league rivals Jagiellonia Białystok in 2015, before having his contract terminated in January 2016. After Jagiellonia, Rosa had short spells with Stilon Gorzów Wielkopolski and Świt Szczecin before joining ROW Rybnik in 2017.

References

External links

1994 births
Polish footballers
Association football goalkeepers
Living people
Lechia Gdańsk II players
Lechia Gdańsk players
Jagiellonia Białystok players
Stilon Gorzów Wielkopolski players
Odra Opole players
Wisła Kraków players
Motor Lublin players
III liga players
II liga players
I liga players